TV Brasil is a publicly owned Brazilian television network made up of four owned-and-operated stations and over 35 affiliates. This is a list of TV Brasil's affiliates and broadcast relay stations, arranged alphabetically by state. Stations listed in bold are owned and operated by TV Brasil.

Affiliates

Amapá
 Macapá - TV Tarumã (Channel 16.1)

Amazonas
 Manaus - TV Encontro das Águas (Channel 2.1)

Bahia
 Salvador - TVE Bahia (Channel 2.1)
 Vitória da Conquista - TV UESB (Channel 4.1)
 Irecê - TV Irecê (Channel 9.1)

Ceará
 Fortaleza - TV Ceará (Channel 5.1)
 Aracati - TV Aracati (Channel 7 VHF)

Distrito Federal
 Brasília - TV Brasil Capital (Channel 2.1)

Espírito Santo
 Vitória - TVE ES (Channel 2.1)
 Guarapari - TV Guarapari (Channel 9.1)

Goiás
 Caldas Novas - TV Caldas (34.1)
 Goiânia - TV UFG (Channel 14.1)
 Santa Helena de Goiás - TV Rios (14)

Maranhão
 São Luís - TV Brasil São Luís (Channel 2.1)

Mato Grosso
 Cuiabá - TV Universidade (Channel 2.1)

Minas Gerais
 Belo Horizonte - Rede Minas (Channel 9.1 and 9.2 (simulcast SD))
 Poços de Caldas - TV Plan (Channel 47 UHF)
 São Sebastião do Paraíso - TV Paraíso (Channel 10 VHF)

Paraíba
 João Pessoa - TV Universitária (Channel 43.1)

Paraná
 Curitiba - TV Paraná Turismo (Channel 9.1)
 Francisco Beltrão - TV Beltrão (Channel 13 VHF)
 Campo Mourão - TV Carajás (Channel 2 VHF and 59 Digital)

Pernambuco
 Recife - TV Universitária (Channel 11.1)
 Caruaru - TV Pernambuco (Channel 12 VHF)

Piauí
 Parnaíba - TV Delta (Channel 2 VHF)
 Picos - TV Picos (Channel 13 VHF)
 Teresina - TV Antares (Channel 2.1)

Rio de Janeiro
 Maricá - TV Barra Leste (Channel 46 UHF)
 Rio de Janeiro - TV Brasil Rio de Janeiro (Channel 2.1)
 Volta Redonda - TV Volta Redonda (Channel 3 VHF)

Rio Grande do Norte
 Natal - TV Universitária (Channel 5.1)

Rio Grande do Sul
 Porto Alegre - TVE RS (Channel 30 Digital)
 Caxias do Sul - UCS TV (Channel 27 UHF)

Roraima
 Boa Vista - TV Universitária (Channel 2.1)

São Paulo
 Americana - TV Todo Dia (Channel 46 UHF)
 Barretos - TV Barretos (Channel 31 UHF)
 Birigui - TV Birigui (Channel 19 UHF)
 Cruzeiro - TV Cruzeiro (Channel 32 UHF)
 Ibitinga - TV Cidade (Channel 42 UHF)
 Jundiaí - Rede Paulista (Channel 14 UHF)
 Matão - TV Matão (Channel 58 UHF)
 Piracicaba - TV Beira Rio (Channel 32 UHF)
 Ribeirão Preto - TV Thathi (Channel 33 UHF)
 Santos - TV UniSantos (Channel 40 UHF)
 São Bernardo do Campo - TV dos Trabalhadores (Canal 46 UHF)
 São Carlos - TVE São Carlos (Channel 48 UHF)
 São Paulo - TV Brasil São Paulo (Channel 68 UHF)
 São Vicente - Santa Cecília TV (Channel 52 UHF)
 Sertãozinho - STZ TV (Channel 59 UHF)
 Sorocaba - TV Metropolitana (Channel 39 UHF)
 Votuporanga - TV UNIFEV (Channel 55 UHF)

Santa Catarina 
 Florianópolis - TV USFC (Channel 63 Digital)
 Araranguá - ARTV (Channel 5 VHF)

Tocantins
 Araguaína - TV Arantins (Channel 13 VHF)

Broadcast relay stations

Amazonas
 Tefé - Channel 12 VHF

Goiás
 Goianésia - Channel 13 VHF

Maranhão
 Arari - Channel 13 VHF
 Cajari - Channel 42 VHF
 Penalva - Channel 48 VHF
 Pio XII - Channel 5 VHF
 Santa Inês - Channel 3 VHF
 Viana - Channel 36 VHF

Mato Grosso
 Alta Floresta - Channel 10 VHF

Pará
 Abaetetuba - Channel 11 VHF
 Acará - Channel 9 VHF
 Baião - Channel 8 VHF
 Bragança - Channel 11 VHF
 Brasil Novo - Channel 5 VHF
 Breves - Channel 10 VHF
 Cametá - Channel 3 VHF
 Capanema - Channel 9 VHF
 Castanhal - Channel 8 VHF
 Conceição do Araguaia - Channel 5 VHF
 Curionópolis - Channel 3 VHF
 Curuçá - Channel 5 VHF
 Floresta do Araguaia - Channel 3 VHF
 Igarapé-Açu - Channel 12 VHF
 Igarapé-Miri - Channel 9 VHF
 Ipixuna do Pará - Channel 9 VHF
 Irituia - Channel 3 VHF
 Mãe do Rio - Channel 11 VHF
 Marapanim - Channel 11 VHF
 Medicilândia - Channel 7 VHF
 Melgaço - Channel 11 VHF
 Monte Alegre - Channel 13 VHF
 Óbidos - Channel 5 VHF
 Oriximiná - Channel 11 VHF
 Ourém - Channel 12 VHF
 Portel - Channel 13 VHF
 Rondon do Pará - Channel 12 VHF
 Salinópolis - Channel 8 VHF
 Santa Cruz do Arari - Channel 9 VHF
 Santa Luzia do Pará - Channel 13 VHF
 Santa Maria do Pará - Channel 5 VHF
 São Félix do Xingu - Channel 9 VHF
 São Miguel do Guamá - Channel 10 VHF
 Senador José Porfírio - Channel 11 VHF
 Soure - Channel 9 VHF
 Terra Santa - Channel 3 VHF
 Tomé-Açu - Channel 12 VHF
 Vigia - Channel 12 VHF

Paraíba
 Campina Grande - Channel 43 UHF (in implementation)

Pernambuco
 Fernando de Noronha - Channel 7 VHF

Santa Catarina
 Lages - Channel 5 VHF

Via Satellite
 Satellite Star One C2 Analog
 Frequency: 1400 MHz
 Polarization: Horizontal
 BW filter: 18 MHz
 Satélite Star One C2 Digital
 Frequency: 3631 MHz
 Symbol Rate: 4687 kbit/s
 Polarization: Horizontal
 Video: 308
 Audio: 256
 PCR: 8190

References

TV Brasil
TV Brasil